Narsingh Makwana  is an Indian politician. He was elected to the Lok Sabha lower house of the Parliament of India from  Dhandhuka, Gujarat  as a member of the Indian National Congress.

References

External links
Official Biographical Sketch in Lok Sabha Website

Lok Sabha members from Gujarat
India MPs 1980–1984
India MPs 1984–1989